The City of the Saved is a fictional setting originating within the Faction Paradox universe, created by Philip Purser-Hallard for The Book of the War and employed by him and others (including Simon Bucher-Jones, Kelly Hale, Stephen Marley, Lance Parkin, Ian Potter and Dale Smith) in various volumes. It has been described in The Encyclopedia of Science Fiction as a "cosmological hot-spot city located in a kind of safe zone between the end of this universe and the beginning of the next", and by a British Fantasy Society reviewer as "a wide-ranging and flexible format where almost anything can happen".

The City is a self-contained location existing after the end of the universe, which takes the form of a city the size of a spiral galaxy.  It is a secular, technological heaven in which all human dead have been resurrected, from the earliest sentient hominids to humanity’s distant posthuman descendants.  The City is portrayed as a pluralist, pacifist utopia in which violence is impossible and tolerance is paramount, although there are many Citizens with philosophical objections to this form of paradise.

The City's vast population also includes the resurrectees' City-born descendants, and the Remakes, human beings created in imitation of fictional characters.  Historical characters whose afterlives have been explored include the Pharaoh Akhenaten, Socrates, the Emperor Claudius, Jesus of Nazareth, Vlad the Impaler, Richard III, Henry VIII, Anne Boleyn, William Shakespeare, Arthur Conan Doyle, Adolf Hitler, J. R. R. Tolkien, Philip K. Dick and Kurt Cobain.  Remake characters in the series include a Don Juan, a Richard III, a Lemuel Gulliver, a Man with No Name, an Inigo Montoya, and multiple Sherlock Holmeses, Dr. Watsons and other associated characters.

It is revealed in Of the City of the Saved... that the City is actually the body of the sentient timeship Compassion, who has resurrected humanity in its entirety to save it from a universe-spanning war.  As a result of the novel’s events, violence becomes possible in the City, and this affects the action of its sequel, A Hundred Words from a Civil War, and some of the events in the subsequent multi-author anthologies.

In addition to multiple references in the later Faction Paradox volumes, the City was referenced in the official Doctor Who novel range, where The Gallifrey Chronicles by Lance Parkin suggests that the City is part of the same project of reconstruction as the restoration of the Doctor's home planet Gallifrey.

List of appearances
 Various entries in The Book of the War (anthology, Mad Norwegian Press 2002, edited by Lawrence Miles).
 Of the City of the Saved... (novel, Mad Norwegian Press 2004).
 A Hundred Words from a Civil War (short story) in A Romance in Twelve Parts (anthology, Obverse Books 2011, edited by Lawrence Miles and Stuart Douglas).
 Tales of the City (anthology, Obverse Books 2012, ed Purser-Hallard).
 More Tales Of The City (anthology, Obverse Books 2013, ed Purser-Hallard).
 Tales Of The Great Detectives (anthology, Obverse Books 2014, ed Purser-Hallard).
 Furthest Tales Of The City (anthology, Obverse Books 2015, ed Purser-Hallard).
 Tales of the Civil War (anthology, Obverse Books 2017, ed Purser-Hallard).
 Stranger Tales of the City  (anthology, Obverse Books 2018, ed Elizabeth Evershed).
 Vanishing Tales of the City by Kara Dennison (novella, Obverse Books, 2019).

References

External links
 The City of the Saved at Philip Purser-Hallard's website.

Faction Paradox
End of the universe in fiction